Claude Barthélemy (9 May 1945 – 6 April 2020) was a Haitian footballer who played at both professional and international levels as a striker. He played for AS Capoise between 1961 and 1964, then joined Racing Club Haitien  until 1967, and played one season for the Detroit Cougars in 1968. He played for the national team between 1965 and 1977, including two games at the 1974 FIFA World Cup.

Barthélemy died in 2020 in New Jersey.

Career

Professional
Barthélemy spent time in the North American Soccer League with the Detroit Cougars.

International
Barthélemy also represented the Haitian national team at international level, and participated at the 1974 FIFA World Cup as well as 1970 and 1974 World Cup qualifying.

References

1945 births
2020 deaths
People from Cap-Haïtien
Haitian footballers
Haitian expatriate footballers
Haiti international footballers
AS Capoise players
Racing CH players
North American Soccer League (1968–1984) players
Detroit Cougars (soccer) players
Expatriate soccer players in the United States
Haitian expatriate sportspeople in the United States
1974 FIFA World Cup players
Haitian football managers
Haiti national football team managers
CONCACAF Championship-winning players
Association football forwards